Boora Narsaiah Goud (born 2 March 1959) is an Indian politician in the state of Telangana. Joining in the Telangana Rashtra Samithi political party in 2009 he has won as a Member of Parliament in the 16th Lok Sabha representing Bhongir constituency in 2014 election and lost in 2019.

Goud has quit the TRS on 15 October 2022 & joined BJP on 19 October 2022. 

He earlier was laparoscopic, obesity and gastrointestinal surgeon from Telangana, India. He was an active proponent of Telangana statehood and was a member of Telangana Joint Action Committee.

He is currently the director of Hyderabad Institute of Laparoendoscopic Surgery (HILS) and provides services at Aditya Hospital and Care Hospital in Telangana.

Early life
He was born in Suryapet, Andhra Pradesh. He studied medicine at Osmania Medical College.

Career

He studied till Intermediate at Suryapet and later graduated from Osmania Medical College, Hyderabad, in 1983 with First division and Distinction in 4 subjects. He did his M.S. in general surgery from Osmania Medical College followed by specialization in laparoscopic surgery. He is pioneer of laparoscopic surgery in India and has more than 32,000 procedures to his credit. He is a Teacher, Academician, Trainer in laparoscopy, writer and social worker.

Education

MS Gen. Surgery, 1984 – 1987 Osmania Medical College

MBBS Passed in First Division with distinctions in 4 Subjects 1976 – 83 at Osmania Medical College

Experience

1996 onwards – Hyderabad Institute of Laparoendoscopic Surgery (HILS)

Aditya Hospital, HOD Star surgical services, Bariatric & Metabolic institute (BMI)

Govt. postings

1991 to 1995 Assistant Professor of Surgery, Osmania General Hospital and Osmania Medical College

1987 to 1990 Asst. Civil Surgeon, Medical Officer and District in charge – Laparoscopic Surgery at Mahaboobnagar.

Experience & Academics in Profession

Laparoscopic surgery 
One of pioneer surgeons of laparoscopy in India with more than 32,000 laparoscopic surgeries to his credit, from basic to advanced procedures. Most versatile surgeon in India with experience and expertise in general surgery, GI surgery, gynaec laparoscopy, thoracoscopy, cancer surgery, pediatric surgery, endocrine surgery and obesity surgery

Bariatric Metabolic surgery 
Vast experience in obesity surgery with one of highest numbers in AP and India

Open & Critical surgeries 
Equally well experienced in open & major procedures like PC shunts, liver resections, esophagastrectomies, thyroid, parathyroid surgeries.

Rural surgeries 
As civil assistant surgeon of PHC Amangal contributed to maximum number of family welfare procedures, major procedures like appendicectomy, hysterectomies, LSCS. Pediatric surgery, re canalizations and other procedures with meager facilities and under spinal anesthesia only being surgeon, anesthetists, gynecologist all in one even with meagre facilities at hospital

The following points highlight his career 

 He is a self-taught laparoscopic surgeon
 One of highest series in laparoscopic surgery (more than 32,000 cases)
 First surgeon to spread awareness of laparoscopic surgery in districts and rural areas
 First surgeon to start advanced laparoscopic surgeries like incisional hernia, hiatus hernia, carcinoma colon, cancer cervix etc. in Hyderabad
 First person to do thoracoscopic decompression for B spine in Hyderabad
 Received best surgeon award from district collector in 1989 at Mahaboobnagar
 Special appreciation from ministry of health for doing excellent surgical work in PHC

Academic activities 

 Conducted more than 40 workshops on laparoscopic surgery
 Conducted more than 75 CME
 Presented papers at world congress of laparoscopic surgery at Singapore, Japan
 Presented number of papers at state and national surgical forums

Organization (Academic) 

 Secretary ASI AP chapter 2 times from 2005 to 2009
 GC member ASI
 Vice president – AMASI
 Honorary secretary – AMASI elected unanimously
 Governing council member – ASI
 EC member HSI (Hernia Society of India)

Political career
He started taking an active role in the latest round of the Telangana agitation. He contested and won as a Member of Parliament from Bhongir (Lok Sabha constituency) on a TRS party ticket, with a margin of over 30,300 votes.

Telangana movement (2009 – 2014) 

 Participated actively in Telangana movement and established DOTS (Doctors of Telangana State). Actively participated in movement like rasta roko, million march, sagara haram, rail roko, assembly muttadi. Arrested twice as part of movement
 Extended professional help to many people injured or needed treatment in Telangana movement
 Made a Telangana Health blueprint

Political life (2014 onwards) 

 Contested as an MP from Bhongir constituency on TRS party ticket and won against a powerful opponent
 2014 till 2018 he has achieved many mega projects in Bhongir parliament constituency like
 AIIMS (All India institute of medical sciences)
 Kendriya vidyalaya
 Pass port Kendra
 MMTS
 Yadadari Temple
 TIF GRIP industrial cluster
 Mother and child hospital
 Apache – Boeing Tata company
 Dry port
 Many more

Fellowships
He is a Fellow of several organisations:

 Fellow Association of Indian Surgeons (FAIS)
 Fellow International College of Surgeons (FICS)
 Fellow Minimal Access Surgeons of India (FMAS)

Awards
 Special Surgical Skill award from Central Health Ministry in 1989.
 Best Surgeon award in 1990.

References
4. https://www.prsindia.org/mptrack/booranarsaiahgoud

5. http://booranarsaiahgoud.com/

6. http://booranarsaiahgoud.com/5-lakh-accidental-insurance/

7. http://164.100.47.194/Loksabha/Members/MemberBioprofile.aspx?mpsno=4803

8. http://164.100.47.4/BillsTexts/LSBillTexts/Asintroduced/1085.pdf

9. http://164.100.47.4/BillsTexts/LSBillTexts/Asintroduced/1046.pdf

10.http://164.100.47.4/BillsTexts/LSBillTexts/Asintroduced/4409LS.pdf

11.http://164.100.47.4/BillsTexts/LSBillTexts/Asintroduced/4231LS.pdf

12.http://164.100.47.4/BillsTexts/LSBillTexts/Asintroduced/4211LS.pdf

13.http://164.100.47.4/BillsTexts/LSBillTexts/Asintroduced/1109.pdf

14.http://164.100.47.4/BillsTexts/LSBillTexts/Asintroduced/326LS%20AS%20INTRO.pdf

15.http://164.100.47.4/BillsTexts/LSBillTexts/Asintroduced/294LS%20AS%20INTRO.pdf

16.http://164.100.47.4/BillsTexts/LSBillTexts/Asintroduced/259LS%20AS%20INTRO.pdf

17.http://164.100.47.4/BillsTexts/LSBillTexts/Asintroduced/4198LS%20As%20Int....pdf

1959 births
People from Suryapet
Medical doctors from Telangana
Living people
Indian surgeons
Bharatiya Janata Party politicians from Telangana
India MPs 2014–2019
Lok Sabha members from Telangana
Telangana politicians
20th-century Indian medical doctors
People from Nalgonda district
20th-century surgeons
Osmania University alumni